Ilyās Farhāt (1893- 1976) was a Lebanese poet who lived and wrote in Latin America.

Ilyās Farhāt was born to a poor family in Kafarshima, Ottoman Empire in 1893. Though he hardly completed elementary education and went to work at an early age, he started writing folk poetry in colloquial Lebanese Arabic. In 1910, he emigrated to join his brothers in Brazil, where he tried to earn a living as a travelling salesman. He subsequently wrote formal poetry, gaining recognition for his first collection in 1925.

Works
 Rubā'iyyāat Farhāt [The Farhāt Quartets], Brazil, 1925
 Dīwān Farhāt [Farhāt's Dīwān], Brazil, 1932. Introduction by George Hassūn Ma'lūf
 Ahlām al-rā 'ī [The Shepherd's Dream], São Paulo: Majallat al-Sharq, 1952
 Diwān Farhāt [collected poems], 4 vols., São Paulo, 1954. Introduction by Habīb Mas'ūd.
 Rubā'iyyāat Farhāt
 al-Rabī'  [Spring]
 al-Sayf [Summer]
 al-Kharīf [Autumn]
 Qāla al-rāwī [The Narrator Speaks], Damascus: Syrian Ministry of Culture, 1965
 Fawākih rij'iyyah [Late Fruits], Damascus: Syrian Ministry of Culture, 1967
 Matla' al-shitā [Approach of Winter], Cairo: Maktabat al-Qāhirah, 1967

References

1893 births
1976 deaths
Lebanese male poets
20th-century Brazilian poets
Brazilian Arabic-language poets
Emigrants from the Ottoman Empire to Brazil
20th-century Lebanese poets
Brazilian male poets
20th-century Brazilian male writers